Murder a la Mod is a 1968 American film directed by Brian De Palma in his first feature film as a director and writer. An experimental, low-budget murder-mystery, it was shot on black-and-white 16mm film. Following its limited theatrical release, the film was rarely seen until its reissue on DVD in 2006.

Plot summary
In a prologue shown from the point of view of a camera viewfinder, a series of female models in a studio are asked by an off-screen cameraman to undress for a screen test. One model is seemingly stabbed by the unseen man behind the camera.

During an afternoon of shopping in Manhattan's boutiques, Karen, another model, tells her socialite friend Tracy about her fiancé Christopher, a photographer and widower. Tracy visits her bank to withdraw money and jewelry from her safe deposit box, which she places inside a large envelope. Meanwhile, Karen catches sight of Christopher in the street and follows him to his studio, where she discovers he is shooting a sexploitation film featuring a deranged prankster, Otto. Christopher remorsefully tells Karen that he lied about being a widower, and that he is reluctantly working for the film's producer, Wiley, because he urgently needs money to obtain a divorce from his wife. Karen pleads with Christopher to let her help raise the money. Returning to Tracy's parked car, Karen finds Tracy has gone inside a dress shop, leaving the envelope of valuables under her car seat. Karen impulsively steals the cash from the envelope and hurries back to Christopher's studio, intending to give him the money. Entering the building, she is surprised by Otto, who pretends to stab her with a dummy ice-pick (a prop from Wiley's film) and squirts her with ketchup. After walking inside the studio and cleaning herself up, Karen is then stabbed to death by a genuine assailant wielding a real ice-pick.

The film then shows events from the viewpoints of the three other main characters: Tracy follows Otto, who is wheeling a large trunk apparently containing Karen's corpse to a nearby cemetery; Otto discovers Karen's corpse in the studio and attempts to lure the killer to the cemetery with an empty trunk; while Christopher, who has been spying on Karen and Tracy during their shopping expedition, pursues Otto and Tracy to the cemetery. The killer is revealed to be Christopher, who has secretly filmed his murder of Karen. After a fight in the cemetery, Christopher and Otto both return separately to the studio.  Christopher kills Wiley when he finds him watching the footage of Karen's murder. He then turns and is shocked to see Karen's corpse apparently moving towards him and brandishing an ice-pick, with which she fatally stabs him. Otto, who is then revealed to have been holding up Karen's body as another intended prank, realizes he has mistakenly used the real ice-pick to stab Christopher, and laughs at the irony.

Cast
 Andra Akers as Tracy
 William Finley as Otto
 Margo Norton as Karen
 Jared Martin as Chris
 Ken Burrows as Wiley
 Jennifer Salt as a 'Bird'

Reception
During the film's very limited U.S. theatrical release, it was screened with  Paul Bartel's short film The Secret Cinema. Kevin Thomas of the Los Angeles Times said both films were "somewhat sophomoric in tone and crude technically", but "imaginative enough to warrant encouragement to their makers." Thomas felt the first half of Murder a la Mod was "terrible", but that "de Palma then successfully comes to grip with a Rashomon-like technique in presenting the murder from the points of view of everyone involved."

Vincent Canby of the New York Times said the film "has a mind and reality of its own. It's completely logical in its use of cinematic tricks — speeded-up action and slow motion, and slapstick humor that is not funny, juxtaposed with mayhem that is. There is a limit as to just how far this sort of playfulness can be carried."

David Nusair of Reel Film Reviews called it "De Palma's first (and worst) feature-length endeavor".

DVD/Blu-ray reissues
Murder a la Mod was reissued on DVD by Something Weird Video in 2006. It was subsequently included as a bonus feature on Criterion's Blu-ray edition of De Palma's Blow Out in April 2011.

See also
 List of American films of 1968
 French New Wave
 New Hollywood

Notes

References

External links
 
 
 
 

1968 films
American black comedy films
American crime thriller films
Films directed by Brian De Palma
Films about pornography
1960s black comedy films
1960s crime thriller films
1968 directorial debut films
1968 comedy films
1968 drama films
Films about film directors and producers
1960s English-language films
1960s American films